Jibu Jacob is an Indian cinematographer and director working in Malayalam film industry. He debuted as a cinematographer in 2002 with the crime film Stop Violence. After a decade long career as a cinematographer, he made his debut as a director in 2014 with the political satire film Vellimoonga. His most recent directorial Mei Hoom Moosa released in September 2022.

Film career 
After a short stint as an assistant cinematographer in Malayalam film industry, he made his independent debut in cinematography with the 2002 crime film Stop Violence directed by A. K. Sajan. Later he worked in a number of Malayalam films as a cinematographer until 2013. He debuted as a director with the comical political satire film Vellimoonga (2014) starring Biju Menon, which was both a critical and commercial success. His second directorial was Munthirivallikal Thalirkkumbol, starring Mohanlal. It is a comedy family film released in January 2017, it became one of the highest-grossing Malayalam films of all time.
He has acted in 2015 movie, Ben in a character role.

Filmography

As an actor 
 Sara's  2021
 Vattameshasammelanam 2019
 Ben 2015

References

External links 
 http://www.jibujacob.com
 

Living people
Malayalam film directors
Malayalam film cinematographers
Indian Tamil people
21st-century Indian film directors
Tamil film cinematographers
21st-century Indian photographers
Cinematographers from Kerala
Year of birth missing (living people)